is a railway station in the city of Katagami, Akita Prefecture, Japan, operated by East Japan Railway Company (JR East).

Lines

Station layout
Futada Station has a single island platform, connected to the station building by a footbridge. The station is staffed.

Platforms

History
Futada Station opened on November 9, 1913 as a station on the Japanese Government Railways (JGR), serving the village of Tennō, Akita. The JGR became the Japan National Railway (JNR) after World War II.  With the privatization of JNR on April 1, 1987, the station has been managed by JR East. A new station building was completed in August 1994.

Passenger statistics
In fiscal 2018, the station was used by an average of 309 passengers daily (boarding passengers only).

Surrounding area
Katagami City Hall
 Japan National Route 101
 Tennō Post Office

See also
 List of railway stations in Japan

References

External links

JR East station information page 

Railway stations in Japan opened in 1913
Railway stations in Akita Prefecture
Oga Line
Katagami, Akita